Polovishchensky is a rural locality (a village) in Kichmegnskoye Rural Settlement, Kichmengsko-Gorodetsky District, Vologda Oblast, Russia. The population was 14 as of 2002.

Geography 
The distance to Kichmengsky Gorodok is 36 km. Laptyug is the nearest rural locality.

References 

Rural localities in Kichmengsko-Gorodetsky District